Muhammad Shamte Hamadi (7 January 1907 – after 1964) was Chief Minister of Zanzibar from 5 June 1961 to 24 June 1963 and Prime Minister from 24 June to 12 January 1964.

References

1907 births
Year of death missing
Chief Ministers of Zanzibar
Government ministers of Zanzibar
Zanzibari politicians